This is a list of lighthouses in Poland.

Lighthouses

See also 
 Lists of lighthouses and lightvessels

References

External links 

 
 

Poland

Lighthouses
Lighthouses